Limnonectes hascheanus is a species of frog in the family Dicroglossidae. It is found in the Malay Peninsula (from southern Myanmar and Thailand to Peninsular Malaysia); its occurrence in the Andaman Islands requires confirmation. It is a small frog, males being  and females  snout-vent length.

Taxonomy
Taxonomic work by Robert F. Inger and Bryan L. Stuart in 2010 on Limnonectes hascheanus and L. limborgi has led to better understanding of these similar species — L. limborgi has been considered a junior synonym of L. hascheanus. While the species are morphologically similar, mainly differing in body size (L. hascheanus is smaller), they are genetically distinct. This taxonomic work has also led to redefinition of ranges of both species, and the range of L. hascheanus (as presently defined) is much more restricted than what was reported in the latest (2004) IUCN assessment for this species.

Life cycle
The life cycle of Limnonectes hascheanus has earlier been reported to have direct development (no free-swimming tadpole stage, which instead hatch as tiny full-formed frogs). Notice that the original observations of this phenomenon came from outside the range of L. hascheanus and probably apply to L. limborgi. More importantly, careful observations have showed that L. limborgi has free-swimming but endotrophic larvae; this probably applies to L. hascheanus too.

References

External links
Amphibian and Reptiles of Peninsular Malaysia - Limnonectes hascheanus

hascheanus
Amphibians of Myanmar
Amphibians of Malaysia
Amphibians of Thailand
Taxonomy articles created by Polbot
Amphibians described in 1870
Taxa named by Ferdinand Stoliczka